Unnatural & Accidental is a 2006 Canadian film directed by Carl Bessai and starring Carmen Moore, Callum Keith Rennie, and Tantoo Cardinal. It was adapted from a Marie Clements play The Unnatural and Accidental Women.

Premise 
Unnatural & Accidental is about a First Nations woman named Rebecca (Carmen Moore) who returns home to Vancouver to be with her dying father and searches for her mother, Rita Jones (Tantoo Cardinal), who has been missing for years. Her journey leads her into the troubled life faced by many First Nations women who have ended up killed.

Awards

2007 
 Genie Award for Best Achievement in Music – Original Song – Jennifer Kreisberg, song "Have Hope"
 Leo Award for Best Lead Performance by a Male in a Feature Length Drama – Callum Keith Rennie
 Leo Award for Best Picture Editing in a Feature Length Drama – Julian Clarke
 Leo Award for Best Supporting Performance by a Female in a Feature Length Drama – Margo Kane

2006 
 Vancouver International Film Festival Best Western Canadian Feature Film – Special Citation – Carl Bessai
 Vancouver International Film Festival Women in Film Award – Carmen Moore

See also
The Ecstasy of Rita Joe, George Ryga

References

External links 
 
 

2006 films
English-language Canadian films
Canadian crime drama films
2006 psychological thriller films
Films based on Canadian plays
Films shot in Vancouver
Films set in Vancouver
First Nations films
Films directed by Carl Bessai
Films scored by Clinton Shorter
Violence against Indigenous women in Canada
2000s English-language films
2000s Canadian films